Jagged Island is an island  long, lying  east of Dodman Island and  west of Ferin Head, off the west coast of Graham Land, Antarctica. It was probably first sighted in January 1909 by the French Antarctic Expedition under Jean-Baptiste Charcot, and was charted and named by the British Graham Land Expedition, 1934–37, under John Rymill.

See also 
 List of Antarctic and sub-Antarctic islands

References

Islands of Graham Land
Graham Coast